The Rexhepi cabinet was the cabinet of the Provisional Institutions of Self-Government in Kosovo led by Prime Minister Bajram Rexhepi between 4 March 2002 and 3 December 2004.

Composition

The members of the cabinet were as follows:

References

Government of Kosovo
Cabinets established in 2002
Cabinets disestablished in 2004